This is a list of diplomatic missions in Iraq. There are 57 embassies in Baghdad, and several other countries maintain consulates in Erbil, Basra and Mosul.

Embassies  
Baghdad

Gallery

Non-resident embassies/consulates 

 (Moscow)
 (Ankara)
 (Madrid)
 (Ankara)
 (Beirut)
 (Tehran)
 (New Delhi)
 (Ankara)
 (Amman)
 (Abu Dhabi)
 (Kuwait City)
 (Amman)
 (Kuwait City)
 (Amman)
 (Ankara)
 (Ankara)
 (Ankara)
 
 (Ankara)
 (Beirut)
 (Ankara)
 (Ankara)
 (Cairo)
 (Cairo)
 (Ankara)
 (Beirut)
 (Abu Dhabi)
 (Ankara)
 (Ankara)
 (Tehran)
 (Amman)
 (Amman)
 (Ankara)
 (Abu Dhabi)
 (Cairo)
 (Doha)
 (Doha)
 (Ankara)
 (Abu Dhabi)
 (Ankara)
 (Abu Dhabi)
 (Kuwait City)
 (Abu Dhabi)
 (Cairo)
 (Ankara)
 (Kuwait City)
 (Dubai)
 (Abu Dhabi)
 (Tehran)
 (Tehran)
 (Kuwait City)
 (Doha)
 (Kuwait City)
 (New Delhi)
 (Amman)
 (Kuwait City)
 (Amman)
 (Riyadh)
 (Beijing)
 (Ankara)
 (Kuwait City)
 (Ankara)
 (Kuwait City)
 (Istanbul)
 (Berlin)
 (Ankara)
 (Riyadh)
 (Kuwait City)
 (Amman)
 (Ankara)
 (Abu Dhabi)
 (Tokyo)
 (Cairo)
 (Abu Dhabi)
 (Ankara)
 (Berlin)
 (Ankara)
 (Ankara)
 (Dubai)
 (Cairo)
 (Cairo)
 (Bangkok)
 (Kuwait City)
 (Abu Dhabi)
 (Ankara)
 (Amman) 
 (Cairo)
 (Ankara)
 (Amman)
 (Tokyo)
 (Istanbul)
 (New Delhi)
 (Ankara)
 (Cairo)
 (Abu Dhabi)
 (Abu Dhabi)
 (Dubai)
 (London)
 (Tokyo)
 (Jakarta)
 (Libreville)
 (Ankara)
 (Abu Dhabi)
 (Tehran)
 (Doha)
 (Beirut)
 (Ankara)
 (Jakarta)
 (Amman)
 (Ankara)
 (Tokyo)
 (Kuwait City)
 (Ankara)
 (Amman)
 (Kuala LUmpur)
 (Kuwait City)
 (New Delhi)
 (Ankara)
 (Brussels)
 (Tehran)
 (Riyadh)
 (Kuwait City)
 (Tehran)

Consulates / Representatives

Erbil

Basra

Karbala

Najaf

Sulaymaniyah

Closed missions

See also 
 Foreign relations of Iraq

Notes

References

External links 
 Iraqi Ministry of Foreign Affairs 
 Ministry of Foreign Affairs of Iraq

Diplomatic
Iraq